The Museum of Libya is a museum located in Tripoli, Libya. It was originally built as the Royal Palace, completed in 1939. It was later used by King Idris during his reign. It then became known as the "People's Palace" after the fall of Ghaddafi. 

In modern times, it is a multimedia museum focused on "Edutainment". Most projection screens are walls of fog being generated from above from tap water, allowing visitors to walk straight through them.

See also 

 List of museums in Libya
 Idris of Libya

References 

Museums with year of establishment missing
Museums in Tripoli, Libya
Archaeological museums in Libya